The Wizard of Oz Museum is located in Cape Canaveral, Florida, and features a large collection of Wizard of Oz memorabilia. It is a 4,500 square foot facility housing over 3,000 artifacts; of note the first known published copy of The Wonderful Wizard of Oz signed by L. Frank Baum, an August 1938 copy of the 1939 MGM movie script, a waist-length reddish fox-raccoon jacket owned by Judy Garland, monogrammed with her initials JG, and an oil painting by artist Natalia Babi of China Girl from the 2013 Disney movie Oz the Great and Powerful. The facility also includes a gift shop, and a large room with 31 projectors featuring both the Van Gogh Experience, and a Wizard of Oz immersive experience.

References 

Museums in Brevard County, Florida
2022 establishments in Florida
Museums established in 2022
Oz (franchise)